The Fontenette-Bienvenu House, at 201 N. Main St. in St. Martinville, Louisiana, was built in 1817.  It was listed on the National Register of Historic Places in 1997.

It is "a one-and-a-half story Creole cottage of colombage construction with Federal details. It is located on Main Street near the central church square in the parish seat of St. Martinville. The house was completed in either 1817 or early 1818 forJacques Fontenette, who died on April 23, 1818. His succession, opened May 4, 1818, refers to 'a fine house, newly constructed'".

References

National Register of Historic Places in St. Martin Parish, Louisiana
Federal architecture in Louisiana
Buildings and structures completed in 1817